Laugh and Be Merry is a poem written by the English poet John Masefield. In this poem, the poet wants us to be cheerful and enjoy our life to the fullest. He also reminds us that we are like a temporary guest who stays in a beautiful inn for a while.

References 

20th-century poems